Tall Pines State Preserve is a  nature preserve in Gloucester County, New Jersey. The preserve opened in November 2015 as the first state park in Gloucester County. It is located on Bark Bridge Road in Deptford Township and the Sewell section of Mantua Township.

The project was a cooperative effort of the South Jersey Land and Water Trust, the Friends of Tall Pines, Gloucester County Nature Club, and the New Jersey Green Acres Program.

Overview
The preserve is open to walking, birdwatching, running, cycling, and picnics. The land serves as a natural filter for the local water supply.

History
The land that became the Tall Pines State Preserve was covered by forest until the early 1950s, when it was developed into a golf course. In 2006, the property was sold to a development company, at which point funds were raised to buy it for the purposes of creating the preserve.

References

2015 establishments in New Jersey
Deptford Township, New Jersey
Mantua Township, New Jersey
Nature reserves in New Jersey
Protected areas of Gloucester County, New Jersey
State parks of New Jersey